David C. Smith (1929–2009) was Bird and Bird Professor of History at University of Maine, Orono. He studied the relationship between geography and wealth. He was born in Lewiston, Maine and wrote The First Century: A History of the University of Maine, 1865–1965, the seminal history of the University of Maine.

In 1994, Smith won the James Madison Prize of the Society for History in the Federal Government for his article with Judy Barrett Litoff, "To the Rescue of the Crops: The Women's Land Army in World War II".

Publications 
 Climate, Agriculture, History: An Introduction. In: Agricultural History, vol. 63, no. 2, 1989, pp. 1–6.
 David C. Smith, (1986) H. G. Wells: Desperately Mortal: A Biography, New Haven and London: Yale University Press.

References

1929 births
2009 deaths
20th-century American historians
American male non-fiction writers
University of Maine faculty
People from Lewiston, Maine
Historians of Maine
Historians from Maine
20th-century American male writers
American socialists
World government